The 2014 Santaizi ATP Challenger was a professional tennis tournament played on carpet courts. It was the first edition of the tournament which was part of the 2014 ATP Challenger Tour. It took place in Taipei, Taiwan between 28 April and 4 May 2014.

Singles main-draw entrants

Seeds

Other entrants
The following players received wildcards into the singles main draw:
  Wang Chieh-fu
  Yu Cheng-yu
  Yang Shao-chi
  Hung Jui-chen

The following players received entry from the qualifying draw:
  Chuang Ting-yu
  Peng Hsien-yin
  Blake Mott
  Tang Chih-chun

Doubles main-draw entrants

Seeds

Other entrants
The following pairs received wildcards into the doubles main draw:
  Ho Chih-jen /  Hung Jui-chen
  Jason Jung /  Yang Shao-chi
  Chuang Ting-yu /  Yu Cheng-yu

Champions

Singles

  Gilles Müller def.  John-Patrick Smith, 6–3, 6–3

Doubles

  Samuel Groth /  Chris Guccione def.  Austin Krajicek /  John-Patrick Smith, 6–4, 5–7, [10–8]

References
 Combo Main Draw

Santaizi ATP Challenger
Santaizi ATP Challenger
Santaizi ATP Challenger
Santaizi ATP Challenger
2014 in Taiwanese tennis